Matías Oscar Montero (born May 7, 1994) is an Argentine professional footballer. He was born in La Pampa and currently plays for Celaya F.C.

References

External links
 

1994 births
Living people
Argentine footballers
Association football midfielders
Club Celaya footballers
Irapuato F.C. footballers
Ascenso MX players
Liga Premier de México players
Argentine expatriate footballers
Argentine expatriate sportspeople in Mexico
Expatriate footballers in Mexico
People from La Pampa Province